Språkrådet may refer to:
 The Swedish Language Council
 The Language Council of Norway